This article encompasses the 1850s Pacific typhoon seasons. The list is very incomplete; information on early typhoon seasons is patchy and relies heavily on individual observations of travellers and ships. There were no comprehensive records kept by a central organisation at this early time.

1850 season 
A typhoon struck Manila Bay in the Philippines in May. Around 1850, a typhoon killed about 50 people on Rongelap Atoll in the Marshall Islands.

1851 season 
A typhoon struck Passi in the Philippines in December.

1852 season 
Typhoon at Miyako
Typhoon recorded at Miyako in the Ryukyu Islands. Miyako was also hit by a storm surge. 3,000 people died in the subsequent famine and disease.

A typhoon was also reported near Vietnam.

1853 season 
On 17 July, ships near Okinawa reported falling pressure and increasing winds, a sign of an approaching storm. During the subsequent days, swells became stronger as the storm moved toward northeastern China. The winds split the inner jib and the foresail of the British schooner Eament. Turning back east, the storm moved through the Ryukyu Islands. The ship-based observations suggest a spatially enormous, slow moving tropical storm (or typhoon) in the East China Sea, and force-6 winds continued to be reported through 31 July.

In September 1853, a typhoon struck Guam.

1854 season 
Typhoons were recorded at Okinawa in 1854.

1855 season 
A typhoon struck Guam in September.

1858 season 
There were two tropical cyclones in the western Pacific in 1858, one of which was a typhoon.

References

Bibliography 
Redfield, William C., 1856:
"Observations in Relation to Cyclones of the Western Pacific: Embraced in a Communication to Commodore Perry"
Commodore Matthew Calbraith Perry, USN, and Francis Lister Hawks, DD, LLD, Eds., Vol II, United States Senate Executive Document No. 79 (33rd Congress, 2nd Session), 333–359.
Archive.org: Narrative of the Expedition of an American Squadron to the China Seas and Japan, Performed in the Years 1852, 1853, and 1854, under the Command of Commodore M. C. Perry, United States Navy, by Order of the Government of the United States

 
Pacific typhoons
Pacific typhoons
Pacific typhoons
Pacific typhoons